Afra Koti-ye Mir Ali Tabar (also Romanized as Āfrā Kotī-ye Mīr ʿAlī Tabār) is a village in Sajjadrud Rural District, Bandpey-ye Sharqi District, Babol County, Mazandaran Province, Iran. At the 2006 census, its population was 21, in 7 families.

References 

Populated places in Babol County